Giacomo Callegari (born 26 May 1971) is a retired Italian footballer who played as a midfielder.

References

1971 births
Living people
Italian footballers
ACF Fiorentina players
A.C.N. Siena 1904 players
Matera Calcio players
U.S. Città di Pontedera players
A.C. Trento 1921 players
U.S. Poggibonsi players
F.C. Grosseto S.S.D. players
Association football midfielders
Serie A players
Serie B players